The "b" word is a euphemism generally used to replace a profane word starting with the letter b. The profanity in question may be:

 Bastard (disambiguation)
 Bitch (slang)
 Bollocks